The Antiguo Casino de Puerto Rico, located at Avenida Ponce de León 1 in San Juan, Puerto Rico, is a Beaux Arts architecture style building dating from 1917.  It was listed on the National Register of Historic Places in 1977.

History

The building was designed by Montilla & Ferrer and construction began under the supervision of the Del Valle Zeno brothers' firm. Construction for the new building started in 1913, with a budget of $80,000. Lack of funds caused the construction to shut down. Construction restarted in 1914, with the Jiménez y Benítez engineering handling the building work. In 1915, construction was halted once again, It was restarted a year later with sculptor José Albrizzio designing the interior. The Antiguo Casino de Puerto Rico was finally inaugurated on July 24, 1917.

During World War II, the building was used as an officers' club by the United States Army. Shortly after the end of the war, in 1946 the building was transferred to the government of Puerto Rico, who turned it into the Escuela Libre de Música Ernesto Ramos Antonini.

By 1955, the school was relocated and the building became the first headquarters of the Instituto de Cultura Puertorriqueña, serving in that function until 1970. In the early 80s, the Puerto Rico Department of State converted the building into the Official Reception Center of the Commonwealth of Puerto Rico. In 2010, management of the facility was turned to the Puerto Rico Convention District Authority, a government agency of Puerto Rico. The Convention District Authority manages a number of facilities in the Convention Center District, in San Juan, Puerto Rico, including the Puerto Rico Convention Center.

Features

Designed in a Beaux Arts style, the Antiguo Casino features gardens, balconies, moldings, white marble floors, and a grand central staircase. One of its distinguished features is the ballroom's twelve-foot chandelier. The building is also known for its use of mirrors in the interior decoration.

The building has become a popular venue for weddings, particularly destination weddings, quinceañeras and corporate events.

Gallery

References

External links
Official Site of the Antiguo Casino de Puerto Rico
Official Pinterest of the Antiguo Casino de Puerto Rico
Antiguo Casino de Puerto Rico Brochure

Cultural infrastructure completed in 1917
National Register of Historic Places in San Juan, Puerto Rico
1917 establishments in Puerto Rico
Beaux-Arts architecture in Puerto Rico
Clubhouses on the National Register of Historic Places in Puerto Rico
Government buildings on the National Register of Historic Places in Puerto Rico